Macromia indica is a species of dragonfly in the family Macromiidae. It is an endemic dragonfly and found only in Western Ghats in India.

Description and habitat
It is a medium sized dragonfly with emerald-green eyes. Its thorax is reddish-brown, with a dark green metallic reflex. There is a narrow oblique stripe on each side in citron-yellow. Abdomen is black, with the yellow annules brighter and broader. Segment 2 has a very broad annule, covering quite half the length of segment. Aall annules on segments 3 to 6 broadly confluent over dorsum and confluent below with abdominal spots. There is a basal spot on segment 8. Segment 10 has a strong mid-dorsal
carina. Anal appendages are black.

The very broad annules on the abdomen and the dark blackish-brown patch at the bases of its wings distinguish it from other Macromia species.

This species usually found patrolling the banks of the rivers.

See also
 List of odonates of India
 List of odonata of Kerala

References

Macromiidae
Taxa named by Frederic Charles Fraser